Emil Le Giang (born 26 February 1991 in Lučenec) is a Slovak football striker who currently plays for Austrian club Union Wallsee. His younger brother Patrik is also footballer, who plays for MŠK Žilina. He is of Vietnamese descent.

Club career

In July 2011, he joined Slovak club MFK Zemplín Michalovce on a one-year loan from MŠK Žilina. Emil made his debut for MFK Zemplín Michalovce against MFK Dubnica on 13 August 2011. In summer 2013, he joined to FC Nitra on loan from FTC Fiľakovo. On 28 September 2013, Emil returned to FTC Fiľakovo.

See also
 List of Vietnam footballers born outside Vietnam

References

External links
FC Nitra profile
Corgoň Liga profile

Eurofotbal profile

1991 births
Living people
Slovak footballers
Association football forwards
MŠK Žilina players
MFK Zemplín Michalovce players
MŠK Rimavská Sobota players
MFK Karviná players
FC Nitra players
FK Iskra Borčice players
Slovak Super Liga players
Expatriate footballers in the Czech Republic
People from Lučenec
Sportspeople from the Banská Bystrica Region
Slovak people of Vietnamese descent
Sportspeople of Vietnamese descent
Slovak expatriate footballers
Slovak expatriate sportspeople in the Czech Republic
Expatriate footballers in Austria
Slovak expatriate sportspeople in Austria